Kushk (also Romanized as Kūshk; also known as Kushka, Kūshkeh, and Kūshk-e Soflá) is a village in Darreh Seydi Rural District, in the Central District of Borujerd County, Lorestan Province, Iran. At the 2006 census, its population was 34, in 11 families.

References 

Towns and villages in Borujerd County